This Is Love is a 2009 German drama film directed by Matthias Glasner.

Cast 
 Corinna Harfouch - Maggie
 Jens Albinus - Chris
 Duyen Pham - Jenjira
 Jürgen Vogel - Holger
 Devid Striesow - Roland
 Ernst Stötzner - Jörg
  - Nina
  - Emma
 Jesper Christensen - Koller
 Knut Berger - Herr Teichmann
 Marina Bouras - Dänische Sekretärin
 Marita Breuer - Simone
  - Frau Teichmann
  - Winnie

Awards and nominations 
2009: San Sebastián International Film Festival - Official Competition
2010: German Film Award - Nomination in the category Best Performance by an Actress in a Leading Role for Corinna Harfouch
2010: Type Directors Club - Certificate Of Typographic Excellence for Saskia Marka (title designer)

References

External links 

2009 drama films
2009 films
German drama films
2000s German films